Arseven is a surname. Notable people with the surname include:

 Celal Esat Arseven (1876–1971), Turkish painter, writer, and politician
 Rıza Arseven (1906–1989), Turkish fencer
 (born 1950), Turkish politician

Turkish-language surnames